301Studios was an American electronic music and hip-hop Independent record label based in Minneapolis, Minnesota from 2003 until 2012.  It was founded by independent artist Joshua Lexvold (of KPT, DEATHDANCE and Give/Take currently). According to the label, 301Studios had taken a business model cue from successful independent labels such as Amphetamine Reptile, Ipecac Records, and Wax Trax! by focusing on artist development rather than searching out ready-made or Top 40 style radio-friendly artists.

As of 2017, Lexvold has gone on to co-found American Independent record label Give/Take with Augustus Watkins of Bijou Noir, DEATHDANCE, Tulip Tiger and co-host of the Tied To The Tracks podcast).

Artists
 As the Evening Wore On
 Boxcar Strainsun
 Codes of Ashes
 Mister Thrasher
 One 2wenty One
 Rek the Heavyweight (aka Spawn formerly of Atmosphere)
 Terrell Lamont
 Thosquanta
 Word Clock

Affiliated artists
(Includes artists who have had individual songs and/or projects released via 301Studios.)
 Amdeide
 Apreil Simpson
 As|Of
 Avenpitch
 Bryantist
 The BS of D
 Caustic
 Charles Sadler
 Colin Mansfield
 Courtney Hurtt
 Dave Swift
 Death By Drowning
 Delta A.M.
 Dissociate
 The Eighth
 Endless Blue
 Evarial
 Fadladder
 Fallen
 Gabrielle
 Gabber Nullification Project
 Heliosphere
 Humanoia
 Jobot
 KMA
 Little Tin Box
 Luio
 Mark Suhonen
 Max Haben
 Monz tha Illeet
 OBCT
 Tameya Clark
 TweakerRay
 Vertiform

Discography
 TheFutureOfMusic I: Electronic by various artists (compilation)
 lovelife. by Thosquanta
 No One From Now On by Word Clock
 Young, Rich & Out of Control by Thosquanta/various artists (lovelife. remixes)
 The Present (Re-release) by Rek the Heavyweight
 Timeless (Re-release) by Rek the Heavyweight
 Two (Re-release) by Thosquanta
 In Vitro Mutilation by Thosquanta
 Life, Sin and God Vol. 1 by One 2wenty One
 Turn the Radio Off by Terrell Lamont
 Codes of Ashes by Codes of Ashes
 Through A Glass Darkly by Mister Thrasher
 Era Origin Decoded by Codes of Ashes/various artists (Era Origin remixes)
 A Giant Orange Sash Over the Pacific-ward Skies by Boxcar Strainsun

References

External links
 http://www.301studios.net - 301Studios web site
 http://www.facebook.com/301studios - 301Studios Facebook page

American independent record labels
Independent record labels based in Minnesota
Hip hop record labels